Yun-seo, also spelled Yun-suh, or Yoon-seo, Yoon-suh, is a South Korean Unisex given name. The meaning differs based on the hanja used to write each syllable of the name. There are 18 hanja with the reading "yoon" and 53 hanja with the reading "seo" on the South Korean government's official list of hanja which may be registered for use in given names. Yun-seo was among the top 10 most popular name for newborn girls in South Korea in 2008, 2009, 2011 and 2013.

People with this name include:

Kim Yoon-seo (born 1986), South Korean actress
Jo Yoon-seo (born 1993), South Korean actress sometimes credited mononymously as Yoon Seo

Fictional characters with this name include:

Kim Yoon-seo, in 2006 South Korean film Forbidden Quest
Jung Yoon-seo, in 2010 South Korean television series Gloria
Kang Yoon-seo, in 2011 South Korean television series Baby Faced Beauty
Cha Yoon-seo, in 2013 South Korean television series Good Doctor

See also
List of Korean given names

References

Korean unisex given names